Louis-Philippe Bourassa (born November 24, 1991) is a professional Canadian football long snapper for the Montreal Alouettes of the Canadian Football League (CFL).

Amateur career
After playing ice hockey for most of his early life, Bourassa first began playing football at Cégep de Trois-Rivières where he also learned to long snap. He then played U Sports football for the Montreal Carabins from 2014 to 2016. In his first year, he won a Vanier Cup championship after playing in the Carabins' 50th Vanier Cup game victory over the McMaster Marauders in 2014.

Professional career

Ottawa Redblacks
Bourassa was drafted by the Ottawa Redblacks in the fourth round, 36th overall, in the 2017 CFL Draft and signed with the team on May 24, 2017. He played in his first professional game on July 8, 2017, against the Toronto Argonauts, where he had one special teams tackle. He became the team's regular long snapper and played in the remaining 16 regular season games in 2017 and in the East Semi-Final loss to the Saskatchewan Roughriders. 

Bourassa played in all 18 regular season games in 2018 and both post-season games that year. He played in his first Grey Cup game, but the Redblacks lost the 106th Grey Cup to the Calgary Stampeders. In 2019, Bourassa played in 16 regular season games and was suspended for two games after testing positive for several banned substances, including ibutamoren and methamphetamine. After the season, he re-signed with the Redblacks to a two-year contract extension on December 27, 2019. He did not play in 2020 due to the cancellation of the 2020 CFL season. He spent two more years with the Redblacks as the team's primary long snapper before becoming a free agent on February 14, 2023.

Montreal Alouettes
On February 14, 2023, it was announced that Bourassa had signed with the Montreal Alouettes.

Personal life
Bourassa was born in Shawinigan to parents Michel and Agathe.

References

External links
Montreal Alouettes bio

Living people
1991 births
Canadian football long snappers
Montreal Alouettes players
Montreal Carabins football players
Ottawa Redblacks players
Sportspeople from Shawinigan
Players of Canadian football from Quebec